Trip ni Kris (lit. Kris' Trip) was a travel-themed, lifestyle television special in the Philippines produced by APT Entertainment and broadcast by GMA Network. It is hosted by the "Queen of All Media" Kris Aquino.

The show marks Kris' first TV comeback after almost a year of hiatus upon leaving ABS-CBN.

Host
 Kris Aquino

See also
 List of GMA Network specials aired

References

GMA Network television specials
2017 television specials